On the Terrace at Sèvres refers to at least two 1880 oil-on-canvas paintings with the same title and subject by French artist Marie Bracquemond. A larger version (88 × 115) is held by the Musée du Petit Palais in Geneva, Switzerland, while a smaller version (56.8 × 64.5) is held by the Artizon Museum, Ishibashi Foundation, in Tokyo, Japan.

Description
Both paintings depict three people on a terrace with Sèvres seen in the background.  Stylistically, there are small differences between the two paintings, but it is unknown if the smaller version was a study for the larger work. Like the other works she produced in 1880, Bracquemond explores the nature of the changing color of white in the light of the outdoors.

Provenance
Oscar Ghez, a Swiss businessman and art collector, bought the larger painting in 1970 and it was shown at the Musée du Petit Palais in Geneva where it popularized Bracquemond's work to the world.  The smaller painting was acquired in 1919 by private collectors and passed through several different owners.  The Diane B. Wilsey collection bought it in 2008.  The Ishibashi Foundation acquired it in 2019.

Study

References

Further reading
Rubin, James H. (2013). How to Read an Impressionist Painting. Thames & Hudson. .

Paintings by Marie Bracquemond
1880 paintings